22 Dreams is the ninth solo studio album by Paul Weller. It was released on 2 June 2008.

The album was released on double LP and single CD, as well as a deluxe edition CD, featuring a bonus CD with outtakes and extra tracks.  Oasis stars Noel Gallagher and Gem Archer feature on the album, as does Ocean Colour Scene guitarist Steve Cradock and Blur guitarist Graham Coxon. The song "One Bright Star" features former member of The Jam, Steve Brookes, on Spanish guitar, the first time the childhood friends had worked together since Brookes left the band before they gained a recording contract, more than 30 years before.

The album features Little Barrie and former The Stone Roses member Aziz Ibrahim.  The first release from the album was the double a-sided single "Echoes Round the Sun" - featuring Noel Gallagher and Gem Archer from Oasis, and "Have You Made Up Your Mind". It became his first Top 20 single since 2005, peaking at number 19 in the UK Singles Chart.

It received almost unanimous critical acclaim and was featured on many Best of 2008 lists. Critics called it one of Weller's best albums to date.

The album includes "Black River," a song previously used on the b-side to "This Old Town".

It went straight to number 1 on the UK Albums Chart on Sunday, 8 June, making it Weller's third number-one solo album.

Track listing

Deluxe Edition CD 1 / Standard Edition

Deluxe Edition Disc 2
"22 Dreams [original demo]"
"Rip the Pages Up"
"Light Nights [original demo]"
"Cold Moments [original demo]"
"Love's Got Me Crazy"
"Invisible [Marco version]"
"Big Brass Buttons [instrumental]"
"22 Dreams [instrumental]" (Weller, Simon Dine)

Personnel
 Steve Cradock – 12 String Guitar (1), Vocals (3,4,9,12), Guitar (3,4,7,8,12,14,20,21), Drums (4,8,12,14,20), Celeste (4,21), Piano (7,21), Percussion (8,12,20), Electric Guitar (11), Acoustic Guitar (11,18), Mellotron (19), Mandolin (20), Bazooki (20)
 Hannah Andrews – Vocals (1,9,12,15,18,20,21), Horns (20), Hornpipes (20)
 John McCusker – Violin (1,17)
 Andy Lewis – Cello (1), Bass (3)
 Barrie Cadogan – Guitar (2,13)
 Billy Skinner – Drums (2,13)
 Lewis Wharton – Bass (2,13)
 Simon Dine – Cowbell (2), Horns (2,13), Guitar (2,12), Siren (2), Orchestration (5,7,9,15,20), Percussion (5,7,9), Marimba (12), Moog (12,19), Oo-Ahh (12), Sonic Elements (13), Mandolin (15)
 Charles Rees – Drums (3), Moog (21), Harmonium (21), Piano (21)
 Robert Wyatt – Trumpet (7), Piano (7)
 Steve White – (8)
 Graham Coxon – Drums (10)
 Models Own – Peacock Voices (10)
 Pete Howard – Drums (12)
 Noel Gallagher – Bass (14), Piano (14), Mellotron (14), Wurlitzer (14)
 Gem Archer – Guitar (14), Mellotron (14)
 Terry Kirkbridge – Drums (14)
 Steve Brookes – Spanish Guitar (15)
 Arlia de Ruiter – Violin (16)
 Lorre Lynn Trytten – Violin (16)
 Mieke Honinh – Viola (16)
 William Friede – Arrangement (16)
 Aziz Ibrahim – Spoken Word (18)
 God – Thunder (21), Rain (21), Elements (21)

Charts

References

2008 albums
Paul Weller albums
Island Records albums
Yep Roc Records albums